Neorufalda, is a monotypic snout moth genus described by Hiroshi Yamanaka in 1986. Its single species, Neorufalda pullella, described in the same article, is found in Japan.

References

Moths described in 1986
Phycitinae
Moths of Japan
Monotypic moth genera